House of Hummingbird is a 2018 South Korean drama film written and directed by Kim Bora. The film debuted in competition at the Busan International Film Festival's New Currents section in October 2018, where it won the NETPAC Award and the KNN Audience Award. The film has collected 59 awards including the Grand Prix of the Generation 14plus International Jury for the Best Film at the 69th Berlin International Film Festival and the Best International Narrative Feature Award at the 2019 Tribeca Film Festival.

Plot

In Seoul in 1994, Eun-hee is a quiet 14-year-old from a working-class background preparing to enter high school. She loves drawing and hanging out with her best friend, Ji-suk, with whom she attends cram school. She is in love with her boyfriend, Ji-wan, who she is secretly dating. Her parents, especially her father, tend to ignore her needs and life in favor of helping her older brother, who abuses her physically and verbally. Her older sister is similarly ignored and abused. At her cram school, Eun-hee meets her new, free-spirited Chinese teacher, Ms. Kim, who she quickly forms a bond with. While dancing at a club with Ji-suk, she also meets Yu-ri, another schoolgirl who clearly has a crush on her, and the two become friends.

Eun-hee's life quickly unravels. She discovers a lump behind her ear, which doctors later determine requires surgery to remove. When caught shoplifting with Ji-suk, her father is called after Ji-suk reveals her identity in fear, leading to severe punishment for Eun-hee; when she confronts Ji-suk later, she refuses to apologize for the betrayal. Ji-wan is forced to break up with her after his wealthy mother discovers her identity and lower social class. Despite all the tribulations, Ms. Kim encourages Eun-hee to keep her spirit and continue to move forward. Eun-hee is deeply moved by her advice and grows attached to her teacher.

Eun-hee prepares to undergo surgery, and her father unexpectedly breaks down in sobs over his fear for her, revealing that he does truly care for her. The surgery is successful; Eun-hee makes up with Ji-suk, who apologizes and admits she betrayed her because she was frightened. Ms. Kim and Yu-ri also visit her in the hospital. Ms. Kim reveals that she is quitting the cram school, but promises to keep in contact. Yu-ri reveals that she has a crush on Eun-hee, who seems to reciprocate and kisses her cheek.

Eun-hee attempts to visit Ms. Kim to say goodbye before she leaves the school, but an error on the part of another teacher causes her to be too late to see her, leaving her devastated. Distraught, she argues with her parents that night about her behavior and insults her brother for his poor grades despite his special attention. Enraged, he strikes her so hard he tears her eardrum, but when the doctor she visits suggests she presses charges, she declines. When the new semester begins, Eun-hee spots Yu-ri and attempts to speak with her, but Yu-ri rebuffs her. She later reveals to a confused Eun-hee that she no longer has a crush on her and has moved on. When she attempts to tell Ji-suk, Ji-suk reveals that she is dealing with her parents' divorce and that Eun-hee only thinks of herself sometimes.

While at school one day, the Seongsu Bridge collapses. Since Eun-hee's sister takes the route to school and her bus was involved in the accident, she becomes frightened, but learns that her sister survived due to being late. Eun-hee's brother breaks down in tears with relief, revealing (much like his father had with Eun-hee) that he cares for his siblings despite his abuse, though his sisters seem unimpressed. The next day, Ji-wan attempts to talk with Eun-hee, but she rebuffs him, telling him that she never liked him. She receives a package from Ms. Kim containing a letter and sketchbook, and tries to hand-deliver a thank-you note to Ms. Kim's return address. However, she discovers during her journey that Ms. Kim was killed in the bridge collapse the day before Eun-hee received the package. Heartbroken, Eun-hee returns home and speaks with her mother about her uncle, who died at the start of the film. Her mother tells her frankly that she misses her brother, and that it is difficult to comprehend that he is no longer around.

Early one morning, Eun-hee and her siblings drive to view the collapsed bridge, where she is overcome by tears as she accepts her grief and comes to terms with her loss. The next morning, the family eats breakfast together in harmony—with all the siblings treated equally and paid attention to—before Eun-hee departs for school. She re-reads the final letter Ms. Kim sent her, in which she apologizes for quitting and promises that there are always good experiences to follow bad ones. Despite standing alone in the schoolyard, Eun-hee appears mature and at peace.

Cast
Park Ji-hu as Eun-hee
Kim Sae-byuk as Young-ji
Jung In-gi as Eun-hee's father 
Lee Seung-yeon as Eun-hee's mother
Park Soo-yeon as Soo-hee
Son Sang-yeon as Dae-hoon
Park Seo-yoon as Ji-sook
Jung Yoon-seo as Ji-wan
Seol Hye-in as Yoo-ri
Hyung Young-seon as Eun-hee's uncle 
Gil Hae-yeon as Young-ji's mother 
Park Yoon-hee as Homeroom teacher
Son Yong-beom as Joon-tae
Ahn Jin-hyun as Min-ji

Production

Writing 
Kim Bora, who also wrote the script as well as directing draws from her own childhood as inspiration for this coming of age film, focusing on a pivotal moment in her life, the collapse of the Seongsu bridge in 1994. Her intended outcome as stated in an interview by Marina D. Ritcher was to create a, "fictional film based on very personal experiences." She wanted to highlight to rapid modernization of Korea and the consequences that came with trying to change too much too quickly. Ji Hyuck Moon in his article "Cracks Everywhere: How the Seongsu Bridge collapse Changed Seouls Urban Personality" talks about the phrase, "Bbali, bbali" that was used to describe this rapid-modernization that Kim portrays in her film.

Casting 
As for casting the main role of Eun-hee, it took director Kim Bora three years to find her perfect Eun-hee, Park Ji-hu. They first met in the audition room where Park Ji-hu was asked to read a scene with her onscreen mentor Yeong-ji, Bora states Park Ji-hu was "everything I was hoping for."

Filming 
Cinematographer Kang Kuk-hyun's goal was to remain as true to the time period as possible and make the film as realistic looking as possible. Throughout the film Kang Kuk-hyun and Kim Bora worked to use the camera to bring out Eun-hee's emotions, every move of the camera was intentional to bring out the maximum emotional impact. Kim's goal on the other hand as director, was not to portray any one character negatively, saying that by giving a more nuanced portrayal of the characters she shows how "no one can win in a patriarchal system."

Soundtrack 
Matija Strniša, who wrote the music for House of Hummingbird, won the best original score for his work at the Valencia International Film Festival. The music was made to be electronic and also represent the time period, described as "classical inspired electronic music."

Critical response 
House of Hummingbird received a generally positive critical response. The site's critical consensus reads, "A striking debut for writer-director Kim Bora, House of Hummingbird delicately captures a turning point in one young woman's life." On Metacritic, the film has an overall score of 82 out of 100 out of a total out of 10 positive reviews.

Tomris Laffly from Variety describes the film as capturing the "soft-hued timeless look" of a time period that remains somewhat "hazy." Her review praises the no intrusive way Bora Kim explores Eun-hee's sexuality, never giving it a strict label and allowing the viewer join watch Eun-hee in her journey of self discovery. While she does admit the movie may have been too long for its premise, overall she states it "fleeting reality of female adolescence with sympathy" and intwines the "workings of both family and society."

Elizabeth Kerr from The Hollywood Reporter chose to focus more on the femininity of film. Overall she describes, "Sensitive, keenly observed and unflinchingly honest," and claims that it deserves success in its upcoming run. She praised the relationship that forms between Eun-hee and Yeong-ji, saying when the two are on screen together they are allowed to fully be free in a way of quotidian struggles.

Andrew Bundy from The Playlist talks about how the film explores the fine line of "harsh and heartfelt communication" which Yeong-ji helps Eun-hee discover it difference all comes down to personal understanding. While a little long, Bundy praises the film on exploring the path to show the importance of empathy and understanding.

In 2020, the film was ranked by The Guardian number 18 among the classics of modern South Korean cinema.

Box office 
Domestically, in South Korea House of Hummingbird grossed $997,953. It opened in 140 theaters and in its opening weekend it made $103,027.

Awards and nominations

References

External links
 

 
 

2018 films
2010s Korean-language films
2010s coming-of-age drama films
South Korean LGBT-related films
South Korean coming-of-age drama films
2018 drama films
2010s South Korean films